Plutoniosaurus is an extinct genus of ophthalmosaurid ichthyosaur from the Early Cretaceous (late Hauterivian) of the vicinity of Ulyanovsk, European Russia.

Taxonomy
The holotype is UPM 2/740, a partial skeleton.

Plutoniosaurus is possibly the same species as the nearly coeval Simbirskiasaurus. Zverkov and Efimov (2019) recover Plutoniosaurus in the polytomy with the Platypterygius type species and Leninia.

Phylogeny
The following cladogram shows a possible phylogenetic position of Plutoniosaurus in Ophthalmosauridae according to the analysis performed by Zverkov and Jacobs (2020).

See also
 List of ichthyosaurs
 Timeline of ichthyosaur research

References

Ichthyosaurs
Ichthyosauromorph genera